Alathur is a village in the Annavasal revenue block of Pudukkottai district, Tamil Nadu, India.

Demographics 

 census, Alathur had a total population of 1480  with 727 males and 753 females. The sex ratio was 1036. The literacy rate was 57.22%.

References 

Villages in Pudukkottai district